The Moscow Mechanism, established in 1991, is a confidence and security-building measure among the 57 participating States of the Organization for Security and Co-operation in Europe (OSCE). It complements and strengthens the Vienna mechanism, adopted in 1989. The two tools together constitute the so-called Human Dimension Mechanisms.

Functioning 
The Moscow Mechanism allows OSCE participating States to request the establishment of an ad hoc mission of independent experts to investigate a particular question or problem related to the human dimension of the OSCE in their own territory or in the territory of another OSCE State. The Office for Democratic Institutions and Human Rights (ODIHR) supports the implementation of the Mechanism, inter alia by curating a list of experts nominated by OSCE participating States (each can nominate a maximum of 6), available to carry out investigations. Experts are appointed for a period of 3 to 6 years and for no more than two consecutive terms. The other participating States may present reservations on the appointment to a maximum of two experts per State. This means that these experts cannot take part in missions concerning the State that made the reservation, unless the latter expressly consents to it. 

A State may voluntarily invite a mission of experts (maximum 3) for the examination or resolution of problems related to the human dimension in its territory. In this case, the inviting State chooses which of the experts registered on the list created by the ODIHR will take part in the mission.

The mission pursues the objective of facilitating the resolution of problems concerning the human dimension of the OSCE through the following activities:

 Collection of information
 Establishment of the facts
 Good offices and Mediation
 Other functions assigned by the inviting State

The inviting State is obliged to fully cooperated with the mission, including by guaranteeing freedom of movement for the experts and the possibility to meet with representatives of civil society. The mission promptly submits its observations to the inviting State, preferably within three weeks since its establishment. The inviting State sends the report to the other participating States together with a description of the actions carried out or that it intends to take in the future to follow up on the mission's observations and fulfill its commitments undertaken in the human dimension.

Mission in the territory of another OSCE State
It may happen that one or more participating States, after having activated paragraphs 1 and 2 of the Vienna Mechanism, ask the ODIHR to verify the willingness of a third participating State to invite an expert mission to its territory. If the State concerned refuses, at least six participating States may initiate the procedure for the establishment of a mission of experts, composed of up to 3 experts of different nationalities from all the States concerned. The requesting States may select one of the experts on the list as a member of the Mission. The State concerned can also appoint a member. The two experts must identify, immediately and by mutual agreement, a third member of the mission. If no agreement is reached within eight days, the third expert is chosen by ODIHR.

Activations of the Moscow Mechanism
Over the years, the Mechanism has been activated twelve times by different States, including within the context of armed conflicts that affected civil society. The Missions of experts dealt, among other things, with: 

- Atrocities and attacks on unarmed civilians in Croatia and Bosnia and Herzegovina (1992)
- NATO's military operation in the former Federal Republic of Yugoslavia (1999)
- Alleged human rights violations in Belarus (2020)

In March 2022, 45 participating States promoted, with the support of Ukraine, the activation of the Moscow Mechanism for the establishment of an independent expert mission on violations and abuses committed in the war of the Russian Federation, supported by Belarus, against Ukraine. The report of the Mission of Experts composed by Wolfgang Benedek, Veronika Bílková and Marco Sassòli was presented to the OSCE Permanent Council on 13 April 2022 and documented clear patterns of violations of international humanitarian law by the Russian Armed Forces in Ukraine.

On 2 June 2022, the same 45 participating States invoked again the Moscow Mechanism to establish a new mission of experts composed by Veronika Bilkova (University of Prague), Laura Guercio (University of Perugia) and Vasilka Sancin (University of Ljubljana) to consider, follow up and build upon the findings of the Moscow Mechanism report published in April 2022.
The subsequent report, presented on 14 July 2022 to the OSCE Permanent Council, confirmed the outcomes of the previous mission and identified blatant violations of international humanitarian law, mainly attributable to the Russian armed forces, as well as widespread violations of human rights, especially in the territories under effective control of the Russian Federation.

On 28 July 2022, 38 OSCE participating States activated the Moscow Mechanism for the establishment of an expert mission to investigate human rights violations in the Russian Federation. The mission will assess, inter alia, the state of implementation by Russia of OSCE commitments in the human dimension and the effects of government policies on civil society, media freedom, the rule of law and the capacity of democratic processes and institutions, as well as on achieving the OSCE's comprehensive security goal.

See also
Preventive diplomacy

References

External links 
 
 

International law
Organization for Security and Co-operation in Europe
Peacekeeping
Diplomacy